Dejan Bekić (Serbian Cyrillic: Дејан Бекић; 8 September 1944 – 23 November 1967) was a Yugoslavian footballer. He died of cancer in the lymph nodes.

References

1944 births
1967 deaths
Red Star Belgrade footballers
Yugoslav First League players
Association football defenders
Yugoslav footballers
Deaths from lymphoma
Deaths from cancer in Yugoslavia